"Highway Robbery" is a song written by Tom Shapiro, Michael Garvin and Bucky Jones, and recorded by American country music artist Tanya Tucker.  It was released in December 1988 as the second single from the album Strong Enough to Bend.  The song reached #2 on the Billboard Hot Country Singles & Tracks chart.

Chart performance

Year-end charts

References

Songs about crime
1989 singles
Tanya Tucker songs
Songs written by Tom Shapiro
Capitol Records Nashville singles
Songs written by Bucky Jones
Songs written by Michael Garvin
Song recordings produced by Jerry Crutchfield
1988 songs